Poozhithodu Weir is a small diversion dam in Kavilumpara panchayath in Maruthomkara village of Kozhikode district in Kerala,  India. This project is a run – off the river scheme utilizing water from Illiani puzha and Kadanthrapuzha . It is 61 km away from Kozhikode and near to Perambra town.The weir is constructed across Kadanthrapuzha. Water from the weir is directed through a channel which is 790 meter in length to a forebay tank. From there the weter is taken to Poozhithode Power station using a penstock pipe which is 125 meter long and 1.5 meter in diameter. The Project started in 2009 and was completed in 2011. The Power plant capacity is 4.8 Megawatts and annual production is 10.97 million units.

Specifications

External links
Poozhithode SHEP Short film

References 

Dams in Kerala
Dams completed in 2011